Nina Sandt (1928–2003) was a German stage, film and television actress.

Selected filmography
 Cordula (1950)
 Maria Theresa (1951)
  (1956)
 Scandal in Bad Ischl (1957)
  (1958)

References

Bibliography
 Popa, Dorin. O.W. Fischer: seine Filme, sein Leben. Wilhelm Heyne, 1989.

External links

1928 births
2003 deaths
German film actresses
German television actresses